KHV may refer to:

 Khabarovsk Novy Airport (IATA code)
 Koi Herpes Virus, a species of virus causing disease in fish, and frogs

See also
 KVH (disambiguation)